Richard Docherty (1899–1979) was a Catholic priest who established the mission at Port Keats, now known as Wadeye in the Northern Territory of Australia.

Timeline
In 1899, Docherty was born in Urwin, Western Australia. 28 years later, in 1927, he was  ordained as a priest, Missionaries of the Sacred Heart (M.S.C.). A year later, he moved to Darwin, and then to Werntek Nganayi 7 years later, in 1935. 4 years after this, in 1939, he moved to Wadeye, where he stayed for 19 years, his longest place of residence since being ordained. In 1958, he moved to the city of Sydney, over 2500 miles away, where he stayed for a year before moving to Hammond Island, a small island in the Torres Strait between Australia and Papua New Guinea. He remained here for 9 years, before returning to the town of Darwin in 1968. 4 years later, he moved south to Daly River. In 1978, he was awarded the Order of Australia, becoming a Member of the Order of Australia. He died the following year, while visiting Perth, and was buried in Wadeye.

References

1899 births
1979 deaths
Roman Catholic missionaries in Australia
People from the Northern Territory
Members of the Order of Australia
Missionaries of the Sacred Heart
Australian Roman Catholic missionaries
20th-century Australian Roman Catholic priests
Catholic Church in the Northern Territory